Collin River may refer to:

Collin River (Chile)
Collin River (Mégiscane River tributary), Quebec, Canada